The Coughanour Apartment Block was an apartment building in Payette, Idaho The building was built in three stages, in 1902, 1905, and 1907.  It was listed on the National Register of Historic Places in 1978.

It is a three-story building with brick pilasters, a brick cornice, tin pediments and pressed tin plaques.

The building was demolished in 1985 and no longer exists.

References

Residential buildings completed in 1902
National Register of Historic Places in Payette County, Idaho
Buildings and structures demolished in 1985
Demolished buildings and structures in Idaho
Apartment buildings on the National Register of Historic Places in Idaho